The Stanville Seated Lincoln Statue is a sculpture commissioned by lawyer Eric Conn and is located in Stanville, Kentucky.  The statue looks over Highway U.S. 23.  The statue is 19 feet (5.8 m) in height including the base of the statue, the Lincoln statue itself is six feet (1.8 m) high.  The statue has been called the 'Second Largest Seated Lincoln Statue in the World;' after the Abraham Lincoln Memorial on the National Mall. However, the seated Lincoln statue in Boise, Idaho, is taller at 9 feet (2.75 m) without a base.

History
Conn at first commissioned smaller studies of what would become the statue.  The statue was dedicated on November 4, 2010, the anniversary of the first and only Kentuckian elected to the White House.  The stated purpose of the statue is to remind Kentuckians that Abraham Lincoln was born and spent many years of his young developmental life in Kentucky.  Conn reportedly financed the entire cost of the statue without any outside financial support.  The cost of the statue was reported to be $500,000.00.

The statue is located in a small town in rural Kentucky.  The estimated population of the rural town of Stanville, Kentucky is 415 based on the 2000 Census. Census 2000

Description

The statue and base stands almost 19 feet (5.8 m) in height. Conn maintained that the statue, if the concrete base is included is the second largest seated Lincoln statue in the world.  The largest being the Abraham Lincoln Memorial on the National Mall in Washington D.C.  The statue is white with a white base.

The statue had to be put in place by a crane.  It had to be delivered in three pieces due to the large size.  The statue weighs over a ton, not counting its cement base that is 16 feet square (1.5 m²) and six feet (1.8 m) high.

See also
 List of statues of Abraham Lincoln
 List of sculptures of presidents of the United States

References

External links
World's Largest Lincoln Statue, Ashmore, Illinois

'Touchdown Jesus' statue in Ohio destroyed by lightning - USATODAY.com

2010 establishments in Kentucky
2010 sculptures
Buildings and structures in Floyd County, Kentucky
Monuments and memorials in Kentucky
Monuments and memorials to Abraham Lincoln in the United States
Outdoor sculptures in Kentucky
Roadside attractions in Kentucky
Sculptures of men in Kentucky
Statues of Abraham Lincoln
Tourist attractions in Floyd County, Kentucky